A referendum on President Askar Akayev was held in Kyrgyzstan on 30 January 1994. Voters were asked "Do you confirm that the President of Kyrgyzstan who was democratically elected on 12 October 1991 for 5 years is the President of the Kyrgyz Republic with the right to act as head of state during his term in office?" The result was 97.0% in favour, with turnout reported to be 96.0%.

Results

References

1994 in Kyrgyzstan
1994 referendums
Referendums in Kyrgyzstan